Challenge may refer to:

 Voter challenging or caging, a method of challenging the registration status of voters
 Euphemism for disability
 Peremptory challenge, a dismissal of potential jurors from jury duty

Places

Geography
Challenge, California, an unincorporated community
Challenge-Brownsville, California, a census-designated place in Yuba County, California, United States

Structures
Challenge Stadium, former name of Perth Superdrome, a sports complex in Perth, Australia

Books and publications
 Challenge (anarchist periodical), American anarchist weekly tabloid, 1938–1939
 Challenge (Communist journal), British Young Communist League magazine, and also the name of the newspaper of the communist Progressive Labor Party (USA)
 Challenge (game magazine), a role-playing game magazine
 Challenge (economics magazine), a magazine covering economic affairs
 Challenge (Bulldog Drummond), a Bulldog Drummond novel by H. C. McNeile
 Challenges (magazine), a French language weekly business magazine
 Challenge (1923), a novel by Vita Sackville-West

Film and TV

Film
Challenge (1984 film), Telugu film
Challenge (2009 film), Bengali film
Challenges (film), a 2011 Sri Lankan film
Challenge 2, a 2012 Bengali film
Challenge (2012 film)
Challenge (2017 film)
The Challenge (2022 film)

Television
Challenge (TV channel), a British television channel
The Challenge (TV series)
Food Network Challenge, competitive cooking television series

Games
Challenge (Scrabble), an element of the word game

Music
Challenge (album), a 1969 album by Yuya Uchida & The Flowers
The Challenge (album), a 1968 Hampton Hawes recording
Challenge Records (disambiguation), multiple record labels

Transportation
 Challenge (cycle and car), an early British manufacturer of cycles and cars
 Challenge 67, a yacht
 MS Challenge, a ferry

Sports
Challenge (competition), when a challenger requests to compete against a champion with the title at stake
Challenge match, a type of exhibition game not part of a wider tournament or series
Coach's challenge (disambiguation), when a coach requests the officials review a play or call

Tourist plane contests
 Challenge International de Tourisme 1929
 International Touring Competition 1930
 Challenge International de Tourisme 1932
 Challenge International de Tourisme 1934

Brands
 Challenge (company), a New Zealand petroleum brand
 Challenge, an electronics company in the United Kingdom owned by Argos (retailer)

Other
 Internet challenge, Internet memes in the form of challenges
 Challenge (literature), an attempt to remove or restrict access to literary materials
 Challenge coin
 SGI Challenge, a family of server computers from Silicon Graphics
 Challenge Girls Club, associated with ECyD

See also
 Challenge Cup (disambiguation)
 Challenge–response authentication in computer security, a component of client authentication in some systems
 The Challenge (disambiguation)
 Challenger (disambiguation)